General elections were held in Liechtenstein on 5 and 7 February 1982. The result was a victory for the Patriotic Union, which won 8 of the 15 seats in the Landtag. Voter turnout was 95.4%, although only male citizens were allowed to vote.

Results

References

Liechtenstein
1982 in Liechtenstein
Elections in Liechtenstein
February 1982 events in Europe